Something In My Blindspot is the fourth solo album by The Slackers' organist and lead singer, Vic Ruggiero. It has been released on February 15, 2008 by the label moanin', based in Berlin.

The basic tracks for the album have been recorded in Berlin in July 2007. Two songs ("Lonely Nites" and "Innocent Girl") had already been recorded for the album Hamburguru, and Animales was recorded on the album Alive at the Ladybug House.

Vic Ruggiero sings and plays guitar, bass, organ, piano and banjo. Lisa Müller from the German ska-swing band Black Cat Zoot sings on four songs. The album also features a brass band, Fanfara Kalashnikov. Drums are played by Andrei Kluge from the ska band Rolando Random & The Young Soul Rebels.

Track listing

 "Taking Care Of Business"
 "A Lovely Beginning" feat. Lisa Müller
 "Innocent Girl"
 "Always Something In My Blindspot"
 "My Place" feat. Lisa Müller
 "Hope I Never"
 "Lonely Nights" feat. Lisa Müller
 "Vacant Stare"
 "If This Night"
 "Is It You?" feat. Lisa Müller
 "Lonely Nights Reprise" feat. Fanfare Kalashnikov
 "A Love Of Confusion"
 "Mad At Me" feat. Lisa Müller
 "Animales" feat. Fanfare Kalashnikov

2008 albums
Vic Ruggiero albums